Tollerton may refer to:
Tollerton, Alberta, Canada
Tollerton, Nottinghamshire, England
Tollerton, North Yorkshire, England
Tollerton Forest
Tollerton railway station